The Brazilian tinamou (Crypturellus strigulosus) is a type of tinamou found in tropical moist lowland forest in regions of Amazonian South America.

Etymology
Crypturellus is formed from three Latin or Greek words.  kruptos meaning covered or hidden, oura meaning tail, and ellus meaning diminutive.  Therefore, Crypturellus means small hidden tail.

Taxonomy
The Brazilian tinamou is a monotypic species. All tinamou are from the family Tinamidae, and in the larger scheme are also ratites.  Unlike other ratites, tinamous can fly, although in general, they are not strong fliers.  All ratites evolved from prehistoric flying birds, and tinamous are the closest living relative of these birds.

Description
It has reddish-brown upper parts, rufous throat, grey breast, whitish belly, and brown legs. The female has a distinct black barring and is ochraceous on its upper parts.

Behavior
Like other tinamous, the Brazilian tinamou eats fruit off the ground or low-lying bushes.  They also eat small amounts of invertebrates, flower buds, tender leaves, seeds, and roots. The male incubates the eggs which may come from as many as 4 different females, and then will raise them until they are ready to be on their own, usually 2–3 weeks. The nest is located on the ground in dense brush or between raised root buttresses.

Range and habitat
This species is native to northwestern Bolivia, southern Amazonian Brazil and eastern Peru.

Conservation

Footnotes

References
 
 
 
 
 

Brazilian tinamou
Brazilian tinamou
Birds of the Bolivian Amazon
Birds of the Peruvian Amazon
Birds of the Amazon Basin
Birds of Brazil
Brazilian tinamou